This page lists all described species of the spider family Leptonetidae accepted by the World Spider Catalog :

A

Appaleptoneta

Appaleptoneta Platnick, 1986
 A. barrowsi (Gertsch, 1974) — USA
 A. coma (Barrows, 1940) — USA
 A. credula (Gertsch, 1974) — USA
 A. fiskei (Gertsch, 1974) — USA
 A. gertschi (Barrows, 1940) — USA
 A. jonesi (Gertsch, 1974) — USA
 A. silvicultrix (Crosby & Bishop, 1925) (type) — USA

B

Barusia

Barusia Kratochvíl, 1978
 B. hofferi (Kratochvíl, 1935) — Montenegro
 B. insulana (Kratochvíl & Miller, 1939) — Croatia
 B. korculana (Kratochvíl & Miller, 1939) — Croatia
 B. laconica (Brignoli, 1974) — Greece
 B. maheni (Kratochvíl & Miller, 1939) (type) — Croatia

C

Calileptoneta

Calileptoneta Platnick, 1986
 C. briggsi Ledford, 2004 — USA
 C. californica (Banks, 1904) — USA
 C. cokendolpheri Ledford, 2004 — USA
 C. helferi (Gertsch, 1974) — USA
 C. noyoana (Gertsch, 1974) — USA
 C. oasa (Gertsch, 1974) (type) — USA
 C. sylva (Chamberlin & Ivie, 1942) — USA
 C. ubicki Ledford, 2004 — USA
 C. wapiti (Gertsch, 1974) — USA

Cataleptoneta

Cataleptoneta Denis, 1955
 C. aesculapii (Brignoli, 1968) — Turkey
 C. aydintopcui Demircan, 2020 — Turkey
 C. detriticola Deltshev & Li, 2013 — Bulgaria, Greece
 C. edentula Denis, 1955 (type) — Lebanon, Israel
 C. lingulata Wang & Li, 2010 — Croatia
 C. sbordonii (Brignoli, 1968) — Turkey
 C. semipinnata Wang & Li, 2010 — Greece
 C. sengleti (Brignoli, 1974) — Greece (Crete)

Chisoneta

Chisoneta Ledford & Griswold, 2011
 C. chisosea (Gertsch, 1974) — USA
 C. isolata (Gertsch, 1971) (type) — Mexico
 C. modica (Gertsch, 1974) — Mexico
 C. pecki (Gertsch, 1971) — Mexico

E

† Eoleptoneta

† Eoleptoneta Wunderlich, 1991
 † E. curvata Wunderlich, 2004 
 † E. duocalcar Wunderlich, 2004 
 † E. kutscheri Wunderlich, 1991 
 † E. multispinae Wunderlich, 2011 
 † E. pseudoarticulata Wunderlich, 2011 
 † E. similis Wunderlich, 2004

F

Falcileptoneta

Falcileptoneta Komatsu, 1970
 F. aichiensis Irie & Ono, 2007 — Japan
 F. amakusaensis Irie & Ono, 2005 — Japan
 F. anocellata (Chen, Zhang & Song, 1986) — China
 F. arquata (Song & Kim, 1991) — China
 F. asuwana (Nishikawa, 1981) — Japan
 F. baegunsanensis Xu, Kim, Yoo, Nam & Li, 2019 — Korea
 F. bifurca Seo, 2015 — Korea
 F. boeunensis Seo, 2015 — Korea
 F. caeca Yaginuma, 1972 — Japan
 F. chiakensis Seo, 2015 — Korea
 F. coreana (Paik & Namkung, 1969) — Korea
 F. cornuta Seo, 2015 — Korea
 F. digitalis Seo, 2015 — Korea
 F. dolsan Lan, Zhao, Kim, Yoo, Lee & Li, 2021 — Korea
 F. geumdaensis Seo, 2016 — Korea
 F. geumsanensis Seo, 2016 — Korea
 F. gotoensis Irie & Ono, 2005 — Japan
 F. hansanensis Seo, 2015 — Korea
 F. higoensis (Irie & Ono, 2003) — Japan
 F. huisunica (Zhu & Tso, 2002) — Taiwan
 F. hwanseonensis (Namkung, 1987) — Korea
 F. inabensis (Nishikawa, 1982) — Japan
 F. inagakii Irie & Ono, 2011 — Japan
 F. iriei (Komatsu, 1967) — Japan
 F. japonica (Simon, 1893) — Japan
 F. juwangensis Seo, 2015 — Korea
 F. kugoana (Komatsu, 1961) — Japan
 F. lingqiensis (Chen, Shen & Gao, 1984) — China
 F. maewhaensis Seo, 2016 — Korea
 F. melanocomata (Kishida, 1939) — Japan
 F. moakensis Seo, 2015 — Korea
 F. monodactyla (Yin, Wang & Wang, 1984) — China
 F. musculina (Komatsu, 1961) — Japan
 F. naejangenesis Seo, 2015 — Korea
 F. naejangsan Lan, Zhao, Kim, Yoo, Lee & Li, 2021 — Korea
 F. nigrabdomina (Zhu & Tso, 2002) — Taiwan
 F. odaesanensis Xu, Kim, Yoo, Nam & Li, 2019 — Korea
 F. ogatai Irie & Ono, 2007 — Japan
 F. okinawaensis Komatsu, 1972 — Japan (Okinawa)
 F. satsumaensis Irie & Ono, 2005 — Japan
 F. secula (Namkung, 1987) — Korea
 F. shuanglong Wang & Li, 2020 — China
 F. simboggulensis (Paik, 1971) — Korea
 F. soboensis Irie & Ono, 2005 — Japan
 F. speciosa (Komatsu, 1957) — Japan
 F. striata (Oi, 1952) (type) — Japan
 F. s. fujisana Yaginuma, 1972 — Japan
 F. sunchangensis Seo, 2016 — Korea
 F. taiwanensis (Zhu & Tso, 2002) — Taiwan
 F. taizhensis (Chen & Zhang, 1993) — China
 F. tajimiensis Irie & Ono, 2011 — Japan
 F. tofacea Yaginuma, 1972 — Japan
 F. tsushimensis (Yaginuma, 1970) — Japan
 F. uenoi (Taginuma, 1963) — Japan
 F. umyeonsanensis Xu, Kim, Yoo, Nam & Li, 2019 — Korea
 F. unmunensis Seo, 2015 — Korea
 F. usihanana (Komatsu, 1961) — Japan
 F. yamauchii (Nishikawa, 1982) — Japan
 F. yebongsanensis (Kim, Lee & Namkung, 2004) — Korea
 F. yongdamgulensis (Paik & Namkung, 1969) — Korea
 F. zenjoenis (Komatsu, 1965) — Japan

J

Jingneta

Jingneta Wang & Li, 2020
 J. caoxian Wang & Li, 2020 — China
 J. cornea (Tong & Li, 2008) (type) — China
 J. exilocula (Tong & Li, 2008) — China
 J. foliiformis (Tong & Li, 2008) — China
 J. jingdong Wang & Li, 2020 — China
 J. maculosa (Song & Xu, 1986) — China
 J. setulifera (Tong & Li, 2008) — China
 J. tunxiensis (Song & Xu, 1986) — China
 J. wangae (Tong & Li, 2008) — China

L

Leptoneta

Leptoneta Simon, 1872
 L. ciaisensis Dresco, 1987 — France
 L. comasi Ribera, 1978 — Spain
 L. condei Dresco, 1987 — France
 L. conimbricensis Machado & Ribera, 1986 — Portugal
 L. convexa Simon, 1872 (type) — France
 L. c. aulotensis Dresco, 1990 — France
 L. corsica Fage, 1943 — France (Corsica)
 L. crypticola Simon, 1907 — France
 L. c. franciscoloi Caporiacco, 1950 — Italy
 L. fagei Simon, 1914 — France
 L. fouresi Dresco, 1979 — France
 L. handeulgulensis Namkung, 2002 — Korea
 L. hogyegulensis Paik & Namkung, 1969 — Korea
 L. hongdoensis Paik, 1980 — Korea
 L. infuscata Simon, 1872 — Spain (mainland, Majorca), France
 L. i. ovetana Machado, 1939 — Spain
 L. insularis Roewer, 1953 — Italy (Sardinia)
 L. jangsanensis Seo, 1989 — Korea
 L. jeanneli Simon, 1907 — France
 L. kernensis Simon, 1910 — Algeria
 L. kwangreungensis Kim, Jung, Kim & Lee, 2004 — Korea
 L. lantosquensis Dresco, 1987 — France
 L. leucophthalma Simon, 1907 — Spain, France
 L. manca Fage, 1913 — France
 L. microphthalma Simon, 1872 — France
 L. naejangsanensis Kim, Yoo & Lee, 2016 — Korea
 L. namhensis Paik & Seo, 1982 — Korea
 L. namkungi Kim, Jung, Kim & Lee, 2004 — Korea
 L. olivacea Simon, 1882 — France
 L. paikmyeonggulensis Paik & Seo, 1984 — Korea
 L. paroculus Simon, 1907 — Spain, France
 L. patrizii Roewer, 1953 — Italy (Sardinia)
 L. proserpina Simon, 1907 — France
 L. seogwipoensis Kim, Ye & Kim, 2015 — Korea
 L. serbariuana Roewer, 1953 — Italy (Sardinia)
 L. soryongensis Paik & Namkung, 1969 — Korea
 L. spinipalpus Kim, Lee & Namkung, 2004 — Korea
 L. taeguensis Paik, 1985 — Korea
 L. taramellii Roewer, 1956 — Italy (Sardinia)
 L. trabucensis Simon, 1907 — France
 L. vittata Fage, 1913 — France
 L. waheulgulensis Namkung, 1991 — Korea
 L. yongyeonensis Seo, 1989 — Korea

L. abeillei Simon, 1882 – Spain, France
L. albera Simon, 1882 – France
L. alpica Simon, 1882 – France
L. berlandi Machado & Ribera, 1986 – Portugal
L. cavalairensis Dresco, 1987 – France
L. chilbosanensis Kim, Yoo & Lee, 2016 — Korea
L. ciaisensis Dresco, 1987 – France
L. comasi Ribera, 1978 – Spain
L. condei Dresco, 1987 – France
L. conimbricensis Machado & Ribera, 1986 – Portugal
L. convexa Simon, 1872 (type) – France
Leptoneta c. aulotensis Dresco, 1990 – France
L. cornea Tong & Li, 2008 – China
L. corsica Fage, 1943 – France (Corsica)
L. crypticola Simon, 1907 – France
Leptoneta c. franciscoloi Caporiacco, 1950 – Italy
L. fagei Simon, 1914 – France
L. fouresi Dresco, 1979 – France
L. handeulgulensis Namkung, 2002 – Korea
L. hogyegulensis Paik & Namkung, 1969 – Korea
L. hongdoensis Paik, 1980 – Korea
L. infuscata Simon, 1872 – Spain (mainland, Majorca), France
Leptoneta i. ovetana Machado, 1939 – Spain
L. insularis Roewer, 1953 – Sardinia
L. jangsanensis Seo, 1989 – Korea
L. jeanneli Simon, 1907 – France
L. kernensis Simon, 1910 – Algeria
L. kwangreungensis Kim, Jung, Kim & Lee, 2004 – Korea
L. lantosquensis Dresco, 1987 – France
L. leucophthalma Simon, 1907 – Spain
L. manca Fage, 1913 – France
L. miaoshiensis Chen & Zhang, 1993 – China
L. microphthalma Simon, 1872 – France
L. naejangsanensis Paik & Seo, 1982 – Korea
L. namhensis Paik & Seo, 1982 – Korea
L. namkungi Kim, Jung, Kim & Lee, 2004 – Korea
L. olivacea Simon, 1882 – France
L. paikmyeonggulensis Paik & Seo, 1984 – Korea
L. paroculus Simon, 1907 – Spain
L. patrizii Roewer, 1953 – Sardinia
L. proserpina Simon, 1907 – France
L. seogwipoensis Kim, Ye & Kim, 2015 – Korea
L. serbariuana Roewer, 1953 – Sardinia
L. soryongensis Paik & Namkung, 1969 – Korea
L. spinipalpus Kim, Lee & Namkung, 2004 – Korea
L. taeguensis Paik, 1985 – Korea
L. taramellii Roewer, 1956 – Sardinia
L. trabucensis Simon, 1907 – France
L. vittata Fage, 1913 – France
L. waheulgulensis Namkung, 1991 – Korea
L. yongyeonensis Seo, 1989 – Korea

Leptonetela

Leptonetela Kratochvíl, 1978
L. andreevi Deltshev, 1985 – Greece
L. anshun Lin & Li, 2010 – China
L. arvanitidisi Wang & Li, 2016 – Greece
L. bama Lin & Li, 2010 – China
L. biocellata He, Liu, Xu, Yin & Peng, 2019 – China
L. caucasica Dunin, 1990 – Caucasus (Russia, Georgia, Azerbaijan), Iran?
L. chakou Wang & Li, 2017 – China
L. changtu Wang & Li, 2017 – China
L. chenjia Wang & Li, 2017 – China
L. chiosensis Wang & Li, 2011 – Greece
L. chuan Wang & Li, 2017 – China
L. curvispinosa Lin & Li, 2010 – China
L. dabian Wang & Li, 2017 – China
L. danxia Lin & Li, 2010 – China
L. dao Wang & Li, 2017 – China
L. dashui Wang & Li, 2017 – China
L. deltshevi (Brignoli, 1979) – Turkey
L. digitata Lin & Li, 2010 – China
L. encun Wang & Li, 2017 – China
L. erlong Wang & Li, 2017 – China
L. falcata (Chen, Gao & Zhu, 2000) – China
L. feilong Wang & Li, 2017 – China
L. flabellaris Wang & Li, 2011 – China
L. furcaspina Lin & Li, 2010 – China
L. gang Wang & Li, 2017 – China
L. geminispina Lin & Li, 2010 – China
L. gigachela (Lin & Li, 2010) – China
L. gittenbergeri Wang & Li, 2011 – Greece
L. grandispina Lin & Li, 2010 – China
L. gubin Wang & Li, 2017 – China
L. hamata Lin & Li, 2010 – China
L. hangzhouensis (Chen, Shen & Gao, 1984) – China
L. hexacantha Lin & Li, 2010 – China
L. huoyan Wang & Li, 2017 – China
L. identica (Chen, Jia & Wang, 2010) – China
L. jiahe Wang & Li, 2017 – China
L. jinsha Lin & Li, 2010 – China
L. jiulong Lin & Li, 2010 – China
L. kanellisi (Deeleman-Reinhold, 1971) (type) – Greece
L. kangsa Wang & Li, 2017 – China
L. la Wang & Li, 2017 – China
L. langdong Wang & Li, 2017 – China
L. latapicalis He, Liu, Xu, Yin & Peng, 2019 – China
L. liangfeng Wang & Li, 2017 – China
L. lianhua Wang & Li, 2017 – China
L. lihu Wang & Li, 2017 – China
L. lineata Wang & Li, 2011 – China
L. liping Lin & Li, 2010 – China
L. liuguan Wang & Li, 2017 – China
L. liuzhai Wang & Li, 2017 – China
L. longli Wang & Li, 2017 – China
L. longyu Wang & Li, 2017 – China
L. lophacantha (Chen, Jia & Wang, 2010) – China
L. lujia Wang & Li, 2017 – China
L. martensi (Zhu & Li, 2021) – China
L. maxillacostata Lin & Li, 2010 – China
L. mayang Wang & Li, 2017 – China
L. megaloda (Chen, Jia & Wang, 2010) – China
L. meitan Lin & Li, 2010 – China
L. meiwang Wang & Li, 2017 – China
L. mengzongensis Wang & Li, 2011 – China
L. miaoshiensis (Chen & Zhang, 1993) – China
L. microdonta (Xu & Song, 1983) – China
L. mita Wang & Li, 2011 – China
L. nanmu Wang & Li, 2017 – China
L. niubizi Wang & Li, 2017 – China
L. notabilis (Lin & Li, 2010) – China
L. nuda (Chen, Jia & Wang, 2010) – China
L. oktocantha Lin & Li, 2010 – China
L. palmata Lin & Li, 2010 – China
L. panbao Wang & Li, 2017 – China
L. paragamiani Wang & Li, 2016 – Greece
L. parlonga Wang & Li, 2011 – China
L. penevi Wang & Li, 2016 – Greece
L. pentakis Lin & Li, 2010 – China
L. pungitia Wang & Li, 2011 – Vietnam
L. qiangdao Wang & Li, 2017 – China
L. quinquespinata (Chen & Zhu, 2008) – China
L. reticulopecta Lin & Li, 2010 – China
L. robustispina (Chen, Jia & Wang, 2010) – China
L. rudicula Wang & Li, 2011 – China
L. rudong Wang & Li, 2017 – China
L. sanchahe Wang & Li, 2017 – China
L. sanyan Wang & Li, 2017 – China
L. sexdentata Wang & Li, 2011 – China
L. sexdigiti (Lin & Li, 2010) – China
L. shanji Wang & Li, 2017 – China
L. shibingensis Guo, Yu & Chen, 2016 – China
L. shicheng Wang & Li, 2017 – China
L. shuang Wang & Li, 2017 – China
L. shuilian Wang & Li, 2017 – China
L. strinatii (Brignoli, 1976) – Greece
L. suae Lin & Li, 2010 – China
L. taixu (Zhu & Li, 2021) – China
L. tangi He, Liu, Xu, Yin & Peng, 2019 – China
L. tawo Wang & Li, 2017 – China
L. tetracantha Lin & Li, 2010 – China
L. thracia Gasparo, 2005 – Greece
L. tiankeng Wang & Li, 2017 – China
L. tianxinensis (Tong & Li, 2008) – China
L. tianxingensis Wang & Li, 2011 – China
L. tongzi Lin & Li, 2010 – China
L. trispinosa (Yin, Wang & Wang, 1984) – China
L. turcica (Danışman & Coşar, 2021) – Turkey
L. unispinosa (Yin, Wang & Wang, 1984) – China
L. wangjia Wang & Li, 2017 – China
L. wenzhu Wang & Li, 2017 – China
L. wuming Wang & Li, 2017 – China
L. xianren Wang & Li, 2017 – China
L. xianwu (Zhu & Li, 2021) – China
L. xiaoyan Wang & Li, 2017 – China
L. xinglong (Zhu & Li, 2021) – China
L. xinhua Wang & Li, 2017 – China
L. xui (Chen, Gao & Zhu, 2000) — China
L. yangi Lin & Li, 2010 – China
L. yaoi Wang & Li, 2011 – China
L. zakou Wang & Li, 2017 – China
L. zhai Wang & Li, 2011 – China

Longileptoneta

Longileptoneta Seo, 2015
 L. buyongsan Lan, Zhao, Kim, Yoo, Lee & Li, 2021 — Korea
 L. byeonsanbando Lan, Zhao, Kim, Yoo, Lee & Li, 2021 — Korea
 L. gachangensis Seo, 2016 — Korea
 L. gayaensis Seo, 2016 — Korea
 L. gutan Wang & Li, 2020 — China
 L. huanglongensis (Chen, Zhang & Song, 1982) — China
 L. huangshan Wang & Li, 2020 — China
 L. jangseongensis Seo, 2016 — Korea
 L. jirisan Lan, Zhao, Kim, Yoo, Lee & Li, 2021 — Korea
 L. shenxian Wang & Li, 2020 — China
 L. songniensis Seo, 2015 (type) — Korea
 L. weolakensis Seo, 2016 — Korea
 L. yeren Wang & Li, 2020 — China
 L. zhuxian Wang & Li, 2020 — China

M

Masirana

Masirana Kishida, 1942
 M. abensis (Kobayashi, 1973) — Japan
 M. akahanei Komatsu, 1963 — Japan
 M. akiyoshiensis (Oi, 1958) — Japan
 M. a. imperatoria Komatsu, 1974 — Japan
 M. a. kagekiyoi Komatsu, 1974 — Japan
 M. a. primocreata Komatsu, 1974 — Japan
 M. bandoi (Nishikawa, 1986) — Japan
 M. bonghwaensis Seo, 2015 — Korea
 M. changlini (Zhu & Tso, 2002) — Taiwan
 M. chibusana (Irie, 2000) — Japan
 M. cinevacea Kishida, 1942 (type) — Japan
 M. flabelli Seo, 2015 — Korea
 M. glabra (Komatsu, 1957) — Japan
 M. ilweolensis Seo, 2015 — Korea
 M. kawasawai (Komatsu, 1970) — Japan
 M. kinoshitai (Irie, 2000) — Japan
 M. kosodeensis Komatsu, 1963 — Japan
 M. kuramotoi Komatsu, 1974 — Japan
 M. kusunoensis Irie & Ono, 2010 — Japan
 M. kyokoae Yaginuma, 1972 — Japan
 M. longimana Yaginuma, 1970 — Japan
 M. longipalpis Komatsu, 1972 — Japan (Okinawa)
 M. mizonokuchiensis Irie & Ono, 2005 — Japan
 M. nippara Komatsu, 1957 — Japan
 M. silvicola (Kobayashi, 1973) — Japan
 M. taioensis Irie & Ono, 2005 — Japan
 M. taraensis Irie & Ono, 2005 — Japan

Montanineta

Montanineta Ledford & Griswold, 2011
 M. sandra (Gertsch, 1974) (type) — USA

N

Neoleptoneta

Neoleptoneta Brignoli, 1972
 N. bonita (Gertsch, 1974) — Mexico
 N. brunnea (Gertsch, 1974) — Mexico
 N. caliginosa Brignoli, 1977 — Mexico
 N. capilla (Gertsch, 1971) (type) — Mexico
 N. delicata (Gertsch, 1971) — Mexico
 N. limpida (Gertsch, 1974) — Mexico
 N. rainesi (Gertsch, 1971) — Mexico
 N. reclusa (Gertsch, 1971) — Mexico

O

† Oligoleptoneta

† Oligoleptoneta Wunderlich, 2004 - Leptonetinae
 † O. altoculus Wunderlich, 2004 
 † O. cymbiospina Wunderlich, 2011

Ozarkia

Ozarkia Ledford & Griswold, 2011
 O. alabama (Gertsch, 1974) (type) — USA
 O. apachea (Gertsch, 1974) — USA
 O. archeri (Gertsch, 1974) — USA
 O. arkansa (Gertsch, 1974) — USA
 O. blanda (Gertsch, 1974) — USA
 O. georgia (Gertsch, 1974) — USA
 O. iviei (Gertsch, 1974) — USA
 O. novaegalleciae (Brignoli, 1979) — USA
 O. serena (Gertsch, 1974) — USA

P

Paraleptoneta

Paraleptoneta Fage, 1913
 P. bellesi Ribera & Lopez, 1982 — Tunisia
 P. spinimana (Simon, 1884) (type) — Algeria, France, Italy

Protoleptoneta

Protoleptoneta Deltshev, 1972
 P. baccettii (Brignoli, 1979) — Italy
 P. beroni Deltshev, 1977 — Bulgaria
 P. bulgarica Deltshev, 1972 (type) — Bulgaria
 P. italica (Simon, 1907) — France, Italy, Austria

R

Rhyssoleptoneta

Rhyssoleptoneta Tong & Li, 2007
 R. aosen (Zhu & Li, 2021) — China
 R. latitarsa Tong & Li, 2007 (type) — China

S

Sulcia

Sulcia Kratochvíl, 1938
 S. armata Kratochvíl, 1978 — Montenegro
 S. cretica Fage, 1945 — Greece (Crete)
 S. c. lindbergi Dresco, 1962 — Albania, Greece
 S. c. violacea Brignoli, 1974 — Greece
 S. inferna Kratochvíl, 1938 — Croatia
 S. mirabilis Kratochvíl, 1938 — Montenegro
 S. montenegrina (Kratochvíl & Miller, 1939) — Montenegro
 S. nocturna Kratochvíl, 1938 (type) — Croatia
 S. occulta Kratochvíl, 1938 — Bosnia and Herzegovina, Serbia
 S. orientalis (Kulczyński, 1914) — Bosnia and Herzegovina

T

Tayshaneta

Tayshaneta Ledford & Griswold, 2011
 T. anopica (Gertsch, 1974) — USA
 T. archambaulti Ledford, Paquin, Cokendolpher, Campbell & Griswold, 2012 — USA
 T. bullis (Cokendolpher, 2004) — USA
 T. coeca (Chamberlin & Ivie, 1942) (type) — USA
 T. concinna (Gertsch, 1974) — USA
 T. devia (Gertsch, 1974) — USA
 T. emeraldae Ledford, Paquin, Cokendolpher, Campbell & Griswold, 2012 — USA
 T. fawcetti Ledford, Paquin, Cokendolpher, Campbell & Griswold, 2012 — USA
 T. grubbsi Ledford, Paquin, Cokendolpher, Campbell & Griswold, 2012 — USA
 T. madla Ledford, Paquin, Cokendolpher, Campbell & Griswold, 2012 — USA
 T. microps (Gertsch, 1974) — USA
 T. myopica (Gertsch, 1974) — USA
 T. oconnorae Ledford, Paquin, Cokendolpher, Campbell & Griswold, 2012 — USA
 T. paraconcinna (Cokendolpher & Reddell, 2001) — USA
 T. sandersi Ledford, Paquin, Cokendolpher, Campbell & Griswold, 2012 — USA
 T. sprousei Ledford, Paquin, Cokendolpher, Campbell & Griswold, 2012 — USA
 T. valverdae (Gertsch, 1974) — USA
 T. vidrio Ledford, Paquin, Cokendolpher, Campbell & Griswold, 2012 — USA
 T. whitei Ledford, Paquin, Cokendolpher, Campbell & Griswold, 2012 — USA

Teloleptoneta

Teloleptoneta Ribera, 1988
 T. synthetica (Machado, 1951) (type) — Portugal

References

Leptonetidae